Hylocurus is a genus of typical bark beetles in the family Curculionidae. There are about a dozen described species in Hylocurus.

Species
 Hylocurus biconcavus Blackman, 1943
 Hylocurus binodatus Wood, 1974
 Hylocurus carinifrons Atkinson, 1989
 Hylocurus femineus Wood, 1959
 Hylocurus flaglerensis Blackman, 1943
 Hylocurus floridensis Atkinson, 1989
 Hylocurus hirtellus Wood & Bright, 1992
 Hylocurus langstoni Blackman, 1920a
 Hylocurus parkinsoniae Blackman, 1922
 Hylocurus rudis Wood & Bright, 1992
 Hylocurus schwarzi Blackman, 1928
 Hylocurus spadix Blackman, 1928

References

 Poole, Robert W., and Patricia Gentili, eds. (1996). "Coleoptera". Nomina Insecta Nearctica: A Check List of the Insects of North America, vol. 1: Coleoptera, Strepsiptera, 41-820.

Further reading

 NCBI Taxonomy Browser, Hylocurus
 Arnett, R. H. Jr., M. C. Thomas, P. E. Skelley and J. H. Frank. (eds.). (21 June 2002). American Beetles, Volume II: Polyphaga: Scarabaeoidea through Curculionoidea. CRC Press LLC, Boca Raton, Florida .
 
 Richard E. White. (1983). Peterson Field Guides: Beetles. Houghton Mifflin Company.

Scolytinae